Rollin' Westward is a 1939 American Western film directed by Albert Herman and written by Fred Myton. The film stars Tex Ritter, Dorothy Fay, Horace Murphy, Slim Whitaker, Herbert Corthell and Harry Harvey Sr. The film was released on March 1, 1939, by Monogram Pictures.

Plot

Cast           
Tex Ritter as Tex Ramsey
Dorothy Fay as Betty Lawson
Horace Murphy as Missouri
Slim Whitaker as Bart
Herbert Corthell as Tug Lawson
Harry Harvey Sr. as Lem Watkins
Charles King as Pat Haines 
Hank Worden as Slim Regan
Dave O'Brien as Red
Bob Terry as Jeff
Tom London as Sheriff
Rudy Sooter as Bass Player
Snub Pollard as Poker Player (uncredited)

References

External links
 

1939 films
American Western (genre) films
1939 Western (genre) films
Monogram Pictures films
Films directed by Albert Herman
American black-and-white films
1930s English-language films
1930s American films